Edward Lazansky (December 9, 1872 in Brooklyn, Kings County, New York – September 12, 1955 in Southampton, Suffolk County, New York) was an American lawyer and politician.

Life
He graduated B.A. from Columbia University in 1895. He graduated from Columbia Law School in 1897, and was admitted to the bar. He was Assistant Corporation Counsel of Brooklyn from 1906 to 1908, and a member of the New York City Board of Education from 1908 to 1909.

He was Secretary of State of New York from 1911 to 1912, elected in 1910. He was a delegate to the 1912 and 1916 Democratic National Conventions.

He was a justice of the New York State Supreme Court from 1917 to 1926, and a justice of the Appellate Division from 1926 to 1943.

He was a founder and chairman of the board of trustees of the Brooklyn Jewish Hospital.

Sources 
  State election results, in NYT on December 15, 1910
  Political Graveyard (giving wrong dates for his judicial terms)
  His mother's obit, in NYT on July 4, 1918
  Jewish politicians, at Brooklyn Genealogy
  Appointment to the Appellate Division, at AJC archives
  Short bio, at AJC archives
  Sketches of the DEmocratic candidates, in NYT on October 1, 1910

References 

1872 births
1955 deaths
Secretaries of State of New York (state)
Jewish American people in New York (state) politics
New York Supreme Court Justices
Politicians from Brooklyn
Columbia Law School alumni